The La Flèche, is a rare French breed of dual-purpose domestic chicken. It originates from the département of the Sarthe, in the Pays de la Loire region, and is named for the town and commune of La Flèche in that area, not far from the capital of the Sarthe, Le Mans. The breed was once famous for the fine quality of its meat; since the Second World War, numbers have fallen very low.

History 

Many authors date the origins of the La Flèche breed to the fifteenth century. An early description dates from 1846. The breed enjoyed a period of fame and success in the first part of the twentieth century, but, as with all native French breeds other than the Bresse, numbers fell heavily after the Second World War.

In the 1960s and 1970s it came close to disappearing; there has since been a gradual recovery. In 2011 a rescue project was launched by the Conservatoire des races animales en Pays de la Loire, the regional animal breed conservation body of the Pays de la Loire region.

Some birds were exported to the United States in the 1850s, but were found too delicate for the climate. Some were exported to Germany in about 1860, and others were exported to Britain by William Bernhardt Tegetmeier in 1882.

Characteristics 

Their main distinguishing feature is their unusual V-shaped comb.

Use 

Hens may lay about 180 white eggs per year, with an average weight of

References 

Conservation Priority Breeds of the Livestock Conservancy
Chicken breeds
Chicken breeds originating in France